Ta'Quon Graham (born December 1, 1998) is an American football defensive end for the Atlanta Falcons of the National Football League (NFL). He played college football at Texas.

Professional career

Atlanta Falcons
Graham was drafted by the Atlanta Falcons in the fifth round, 148th overall, of the 2021 NFL Draft. He signed his four-year rookie contract with Atlanta on June 15, 2021.

On November 21, 2022, Graham was placed on injured reserve.

References

External links
Texas Longhorns bio

Living people
People from Temple, Texas
Players of American football from Texas
American football defensive linemen
Temple High School (Texas) alumni
Texas Longhorns football players
Atlanta Falcons players
1998 births